Dutch Design Week (also known as DDW) is the largest annual design event in Northern Europe. It presents work and concepts from more than 2,600 designers to more than 355,000 visitors from home and abroad. Hosted in Eindhoven, Netherlands, the event is about Dutch design. The event takes place around the last week of October and is a nine-day event with exhibitions, studio visits, workshops, seminars, and parties at many venues dispersed throughout the city.

Due to its industrial character, hosting companies like Philips, Philips Design and DAF, Eindhoven sets itself the goal to become the national industry- and design capital. Also, hosting the Design Academy Eindhoven and the Eindhoven University of Technology, the city produces a profound bases for innovation. In order to communicate these outcomes, the Dutch Design Week is organized.

The initiative started twelve years ago as a non-commercial fair where design, industry and business could talk to each other on 'neutral' ground. Since then, the event grew rapidly each year, to 355,000 visitors in 2018.

The DDW consists of around 120 venues. The main venues during the event are among others the Klokgebouw (Strijp-S), Design Academy Eindhoven and the Faculty of Industrial Design at the Eindhoven University of Technology, where successful and well-visited expositions are organized.

Whereas the main goal remains to create a non-commercial event, many conflicts of interest and the rapid growth did contribute to a more commercial approach since 2007.

Pop venue Effenaar and classical music venue Muziekgebouw Frits Philips both organize the musical program DDW Music around the festival with live performances as well as exhibitions related to experimental musical instruments, sound art and sound installations.

Dutch Design Week 2020 was an online-only event. A digital festival, initially planned to work alongside a programme of studio tours and socially distanced activities, became the centrepiece of the festival as all physical events had been cancelled due to a rise in coronavirus cases in the city.

Theme 
Since the 2012 edition Dutch Design Week picks a yearly theme overarching the entire week.

Ambassadors 
Since 2009 Dutch Design Week picks multiple ambassadors from the field who are advocates of Dutch Design

See also
 Dutch Design

References

External links

 Dutch Design Week

Dutch design
Culture in Eindhoven
Industrial design
Events in Eindhoven